Streptoglossa odora is a species of flowering plant in the family Asteraceae. It is a  spreading, perennial herb with pink or bluish-purple flowers. It grows in Queensland, Western Australia and the Northern Territory.

Description
The leaves and branches are strongly fragrant, and covered with soft, weak, separated thin hairs to long, soft hairs and thickly glandular. The  pink or blue-purple "flowers" are scattered on variable length branches, and florets in a group of mostly 15-30.

Taxonomy and naming
Streptoglossa odora was first described by Ferdinand von Mueller as Pluchea odora. In 1981 Clyde Robert Dunlop changed the name to Streptoglossa odora and the description was published in  Journal of the Adelaide Botanic Garden. The specific epithet (odora) means "fragrant".

Distribution and habitat
This streptoglossa grows in open areas of woodland and scrubland on sandy clay as well as saline depressions in northern Australia from the Kimberley to the Northern Territory into western and central Queensland.

References

`

Asterales of Australia
Flora of the Northern Territory
Flora of Western Australia
Flora of Queensland
odora